Ariel "Ari" Daniel Lassiter Acuña (born September 27, 1994) is a Costa Rican professional footballer who plays as a winger for Major League Soccer club Inter Miami and the Costa Rica national team.

Early life, youth and college 
Lassiter was born in Turrialba, Costa Rica, where his father Roy, a professional footballer, played for A.D. Carmelita.  The Lassiter family moved to the United States after the elder Lassiter signed with the Tampa Bay Mutiny of Major League Soccer. before eventually moving to Temecula, California when Ariel was 13. There, Lassiter attended Great Oak High School, where he played on the school soccer team for 4 years, captaining the team for 2 years.  He received multiple accolades during his high school career, including being named two-time Inland Empire High School Player of the Year.  Lassiter also spent 5 years playing for Albion SC, a youth soccer club in San Diego, California.

Lassiter played college soccer for the Cal Poly Mustangs. He had 5 goals and 4 assists from 21 appearances during his first season for the Mustangs, earning a spot on the Big West Conference All-Freshman team.  He left Cal Poly after his freshman season.

Club career

GAIS 
In July 2014, Lassiter signed with GAIS in the Swedish Superettan.  He made his debut for GAIS on August 9, 2014, playing 70 minutes in a 2–1 win over Husqvarna FF.  On August 23, he scored his first goal in a 2–0 win against Varbergs BoIS.  Lassiter ended his first professional season with one goal from 12 matches.

LA Galaxy 
On January 29, 2015, Lassiter signed with LA Galaxy II of the United Soccer League. He made his debut for Galaxy II on March 22, coming on as a substitute in a 0–0 draw with Real Monarchs.  Lassiter scored his first goal for Los Dos on April 11 to help Galaxy II to a 3–1 win over Sacramento Republic.  He finished the regular season with 11 goals and one assist from 21 games, helping Galaxy II qualify for the playoffs.  Lassiter scored four times in the playoffs as Los Dos reached the final, where they fell 2–1 to the Rochester Rhinos.  He also scored once in the U.S. Open Cup as Galaxy II lost to Ventura County Fusion 2–1.  The 2015 season also saw Lassiter make one appearance for the Galaxy first team, coming on as a substitute in a 3–0 loss to the Houston Dynamo in an MLS match on July 25.

On March 5, 2016, the Galaxy announced Lassiter had signed a first-team contract.  He started the season with Galaxy II, scoring two goals in a 2–0 win over Arizona United on March 26.  The following week, Lassiter got his first ever MLS start as he helped the Galaxy first team to a 0–0 draw with the Vancouver Whitecaps.  He then started five straight games for the reserves before suffering a back injury that kept him out for two months.  Lassiter returned from his injury and played with Galaxy II for the rest of their season, scoring nine goals and recording one assist from 16 games as he helped Los Dos reach the playoffs, where they lost 3–0 to Swope Park Rangers in their first game.  After being eliminated from the playoffs, Lassiter returned to the Galaxy first team and played in the final two games of the regular season. The Galaxy qualified for the playoffs, but Lassiter did not appear in any of the three matches.

The 2017 season saw Lassiter split his time between the Galaxy first team and Galaxy II.  On June 14, he scored his first goal for the Galaxy senior team to help LA defeat Orange County SC 3–1 in a U.S. Open Cup match.  He scored again on June 28 as the Galaxy defeated Sacramento Republic 2–0 to advance to the Open Cup Quarterfinals, where they fell 3–2 to the San Jose Earthquakes.  On July 23, Lassiter scored his first career MLS goal as the Galaxy lost 4–3 to the New England Revolution.  He ended the season one goal from 14 MLS appearances, all coming from the bench, as well as three appearances and two goals in the Open Cup for the Galaxy first team.  He also had nine appearances and five goals for Galaxy II during the season.

In 2018, Lassiter primarily featured for Galaxy II, scoring five goals and recording four assists from 12 appearances.  He saw limited involvement with the Galaxy first team during 2018, making seven substitute appearances during league play and playing twice in the Open Cup, where he scored two goals.

On November 26, 2018, the Galaxy declined Lassiter's contract option for the 2019 season.

Alajuelense 
On December 18, 2018, Lassiter signed with Costa Rican club Liga Deportiva Alajuelense.  He made his debut for Alajuelense on January 16, 2019 in a 3–3 draw against C.F. Universidad de Costa Rica.  He scored his first goal for Alajuelense on February 27 in a 4–2 win over Cartaginés.  Lassiter ended his first season in Costa Rica with three goals from 16 games. Alajuelense finished the clausura season in 6th place, missing out on the playoffs by 2 points.

On July 21, 2019, Lassiter scored once to give Alajuelense a 1–0 win over Guadalupe F.C. in the opening match of the 2019 Apertura.  The following game saw Lassiter score once and record an assist as Los Leones defeated Limón F.C. 2–1.  He scored twice on September 8 to give Alajuelense a 2–0 win over A.D.R. Jicaral.  Lassiter scored another brace on October 6 as Alajuelense defeated Deportivo Saprissa 5–2.  He finished the Apertura regular season with 12 goals and five assists from 20 appearances, helping Alajuelense finish top of the table.  Lassiter made four appearances in the playoffs as he helped Los Leones reach the final, where they lose 2–0 to C.S. Herediano.  Since the playoff winner was different than the regular season winner, a two-legged grand final was held between Alajuelense and Herediano to determine the Apertura champion.  Lassiter appeared in both legs, but Herediano won 5–4 on penalties after the teams played to a 2–2 aggregate score.

Alajuelense opened the 2020 Clausura on January 12, 2020, beating Limón 4–1 win Lassiter scoring once and adding an assist.  On February 4 he scored twice as Los Leones beat Municipal Grecia 5–1. On February 12, Lassiter scored in the 93rd minute to give Alajuelense a 3–2 win over Guadalupe.  On March 14, he had one goal and four assists to help Alajuelense defeat La U Universitarios 6–1.  Lassiter finished the Clausura regular season with eight goals and nine assists from 18 appearances, helping Los Leones finish third in the table and qualify for the playoffs.  Lassiter made four appearances and scored once in the playoffs as Alajuelense reached the final, where the fell to Saprissa 3–0 over two legs.  On May 4, 2020, Lassiter was signed a new contract with Alajuelense until 2023.

Houston Dynamo 
On August 17, 2020, Lassiter returned to MLS by going on loan to the Houston Dynamo. Houston sent $50,000 in general allocation money to the LA Galaxy to acquire his MLS rights.  He made his Dynamo debut on September 2, coming on as a substitute and scoring twice to give Houston a 3–0 win over Minnesota United.  On October 7 Lassiter recorded his first assist for the Dynamo in a 2–0 win over Texas Derby rivals FC Dallas.  On October 28 he scored once in a 2–1 loss to LAFC.  Lassiter ended the season with three goals and one assist from 16 appearances.  It was a poor season for Houston overall, finishing bottom of the Western Conference and missing out on the playoffs.

On December 1, 2020, the Dynamo announced that they had exercised their purchase option to make Lassiter's move permanent.  While the official transfer fee was not announced, it was reportedly around $400,000.  Lassiter made 19 appearances during his second season in Houston as the Dynamo finished last in the West for the second straight season.

Inter Miami
On December 16, 2021, Lassiter was traded by Houston to Inter Miami in exchange for $100,000 of General Allocation Money.

International career
Born in Costa Rica and raised in the United States, Lassiter was eligible to play for both national teams.  He represented the United States U-23 national team twice in friendlies during 2015.  Later that year, he switched to the Costa Rican U-23 national team and represented them at the 2015 Toulon Tournament.

He made his senior debut for Costa Rica on March 22, 2019 in a friendly against Guatemala, coming on as a 63rd-minute substitute for Waylon Francis.

On 1 July 2021, Lassiter was included in Luis Fernando Suárez's squad for the 2021 CONCACAF Gold Cup.  Lassiter scored his first senior international goal on 12 July in a 3–1 over Guadeloupe in the Gold Cup group stage.  He made four appearances, scored one goal, and had one assist at the Gold Cup, helping Costa Rica reach the quarterfinals.

Career statistics

Club

International

International goals
Scores and results lost Costa Rica's goal tally first.

References

External links
 
 Profile at TopDrawerSoccer
 

1994 births
Living people
American expatriate soccer players
American expatriate sportspeople in Sweden
American soccer players
Association football forwards
Cal Poly Mustangs men's soccer players
Costa Rica under-20 international footballers
Costa Rican expatriate footballers
Costa Rican footballers
Costa Rica international footballers
Costa Rican people of American descent
GAIS players
Homegrown Players (MLS)
LA Galaxy players
LA Galaxy II players
Major League Soccer players
Sportspeople from Temecula, California
Soccer players from California
Superettan players
USL Championship players
United States men's under-23 international soccer players
Houston Dynamo FC players
Expatriate footballers in Sweden
Costa Rican expatriate sportspeople in Sweden
2021 CONCACAF Gold Cup players
Inter Miami CF players